Turveria is a genus of very small ectoparasitic sea snails, marine gastropod mollusks or micromollusks in   the Eulimidae family.

Species
Species within the genus Turveriainclude :
 Turveria encopendema Berry, 1956
 Turveria pallida Warén, 1992
 Turveria schwengelae (Bartsch, 1938)

References

 Warén A. & Crossland M.R. (1991) Revision of Hypermastus Pilsbry, 1899 and Turveria Berry, 1956 (Gastropoda: Prosobranchia: Eulimidae), two genera parasitic on sand dollars. Records of the Australian Museum 43(1):85-112.

Eulimidae